Allan Mercer Bristow, Jr. (born August 23, 1951) is an American former professional basketball player, coach, and executive.  Bristow played college basketball at  Virginia Tech, and was selected by the Philadelphia 76ers in the second round of the 1973 NBA draft. A 6 ft 7 in,  small forward, he had a 10-year career in both the National Basketball Association (NBA) and the American Basketball Association (ABA), playing for the Sixers, the San Antonio Spurs (in both leagues), the Utah Jazz, and finishing his playing career with the Dallas Mavericks. His nickname was "Disco".

In 1991, Bristow was hired to be the third head coach for the recently created Charlotte Hornets franchise, a position he held for five years. Led by players such as Larry Johnson and Alonzo Mourning, the Hornets were the first of the late-1980s expansion teams to be successful, reaching the playoffs in 1993 and 1995. Bristow resigned in 1996.

Bristow became the New Orleans Hornets' general manager in 2004, a position he relinquished in 2005.

In 1997, Bristow was inducted into the Virginia Sports Hall of Fame.

Virginia Tech career
After being an all-state player at Henrico High School, Bristow was recruited to play college basketball for Virginia Tech coach Howie Shannon beginning in the 1969–70 season.  Bristow averaged 27.3 points and 17.1 rebounds per game as a freshman on the JV/Freshmen. (At the time he began his career, freshmen could not play on the varsity team). Bristow averaged 20.4 points and 13.1 rebounds per game for the 1970–71 Hokies that finished 14–11. He was second on the team in scoring that season to Loyd King (21.3 ppg), marking the only time that two Hokies ever averaged over 20 points in a single season.

Don DeVoe took over as coach of the Hokies for the 1971–72 season, and Bristow led the team with 25.0 points and 13.4 rebounds in a 16–10 effort.

In 1972–73, the Hokies raced to an 18–5 regular season mark, and a berth in the NIT. (At the time, only 32 teams made the NCAA tournament). Tech beat three teams by four points in the preliminary rounds before facing Notre Dame under legendary coach Digger Phelps in the finals. Tech forced overtime against the heavily favored Fighting Irish, and then found themselves down by one as they took the ball in bounds with 12 seconds to play. Bobby Stevens took a shot from just above the foul-line with about six seconds left, and chased his own rebound down on the right corner where he turned and beat the buzzer for a 92–91 win.  Bristow scored a total of 91 points in the four NIT games. Including the NIT, Bristow led the team with a 23.9 points per game average and also pulled down 11.6 rebounds per contest.

Bristow paced the Virginia Tech basketball team to the 1973 National Invitation Tournament (NIT) championship, and became the fourth Tech basketball player to have his jersey retired by the university. Bristow still holds the Hokies’ single game marks of 52 points and 22 field goals which he accomplished in a 117–89 win against George Washington University.  He also holds the record for most consecutive double-figure scoring games, reaching that mark in all 78 of his Hokie appearances. He finished as Tech's all-time scoring leader in 1973 with 1,804 points, and still stood seventh on the list at the beginning of the 2018–19 season. Bristow also holds the Tech record for career scoring average at 23.1 points per game. He led the Hokies in rebounding all three of his varsity seasons and in scoring his final two years.

Bristow was named to the Virginia Tech Sports Hall of Fame in 1984 and his jersey was retired by the university in 1998.

NBA playing career
Bristow was selected in the second round of the 1973 NBA draft (21st overall pick) by the Philadelphia 76ers. He made his NBA debut on October 13, 1973. Bristow played in 55 games in his rookie year averaging 11.7 minutes per game with 4.7 points per game and 3.0 rebounds per game with Philadelphia. After his second season, Bristow was waived by the 76ers. Bristow moved to the ABA's San Antonio Spurs for one season before the Spurs joined the NBA the following year in 1976. He spent four years total with San Antonio before signing as a free agent with the New Orleans Jazz in 1979. Bristow and Wayne Cooper were traded by the Jazz to the Dallas Mavericks in 1981 for Bill Robinzine. After two seasons with Dallas, Bristow retired from the NBA in 1983. Bristow had averages of 7.8 points, 5.0 rebounds, and 3.2 assists in 648 games.

Executive and coaching career
Bristow began his professional coaching career as an assistant coach for the San Antonio Spurs in the 1983–84 season. He then moved to the Denver Nuggets as an assistant to coach Doug Moe for six seasons from 1984 to 1990. In 1990 the Charlotte Hornets named Bristow as Vice President of Basketball Operations, in charge of scouting, draft picks and trades. Bristow replaced Gene Littles as coach of the Charlotte Hornets in summer 1991, becoming the Hornets' third head coach. He was the first Hornets coach to bring major success to the franchise. He guided Charlotte to its first ever playoff appearance and first ever playoff series victory in the same year. His best season as head coach was in the 1994–95 season when the Hornets recorded a franchise-record 50 victories. He coached the Hornets team to a record of 207–203, but his teams were just 5–8 in the playoffs. In the 1996 off-season the Hornets ended his five-year run as their head coach by buying out the final year of Bristow's contract after the Hornets finished their season short of the playoffs with a 41–41 record. Bristow is the Hornets' second-winningest head coach with 207 regular season victories. Bristow later served as Executive Vice President of Basketball Operations for the Nuggets from 1997 to 1998.

Head coaching record

|-
|align="left"|Charlotte
|align="left"|
| 82 || 31 || 51 ||  ||align="center"|6th in Central|| – || – || – || 
|align="center"|Missed Playoffs
|-
|align="left"|Charlotte
|align="left"|
| 82 || 44 || 38 ||  ||align="center"|3rd in Central|| 9 || 4 || 5 || 
|align="center"|Lost in Conf. Semifinals
|-
|align="left"|Charlotte
|align="left"|
| 82 || 41 || 41 ||  ||align="center"|5th in Central|| – || – || – || 
|align="center"|Missed Playoffs
|-
|align="left"|Charlotte
|align="left"|
| 82 || 50 || 32 ||  ||align="center"|2nd in Central|| 4 || 1 || 3 || 
|align="center"|Lost in First Round
|-
|align="left"|Charlotte
|align="left"|
| 82 || 41 || 41 ||  ||align="center"|6th in Central|| – || – || – || 
|align="center"|Missed Playoffs
|- class="sortbottom"
|align="left"|Career
| || 410 || 207 || 203 ||  || || 13 || 5 || 8 ||  ||

References

External links
 SportsReference.com:  Allan Bristow (as college player)
 BasketballReference.com: Allan Bristow (as NBA coach)
 HoopsHype.com General Managers: Allan Bristow (as NBA executive

1951 births
Living people
Basketball coaches from Virginia
American men's basketball players
Basketball players from Richmond, Virginia
Charlotte Hornets head coaches
Dallas Mavericks players
Denver Nuggets assistant coaches
Henrico High School alumni
International Basketball League (1999–2001) coaches
National Basketball Association general managers
Philadelphia 76ers draft picks
Philadelphia 76ers players
San Antonio Spurs assistant coaches
San Antonio Spurs players
Shooting guards
Small forwards
Utah Jazz players
Virginia Tech Hokies men's basketball players